Tom Kelly is a British actor, noted for his roles in television.

He appeared in three Doctor Who serials (The Face of Evil, The Sun Makers and The Invasion of Time), as well as Blake's 7, Sapphire & Steel and Dempsey and Makepeace.

External links
 

Year of birth missing (living people)
Living people
Place of birth missing (living people)
British male television actors
20th-century British male actors